Geydere may refer to:

Gëydere, Kalbajar, Azerbaijan
Goydərə, Gobustan, Azerbaijan
Göydərə, Azerbaijan